Adem Uzun is a Turkish Greco-Roman wrestler competing in the 55 kg division. He is a member of İstanbul BBSK.

Career 
Adem Uzun captured silver medal in men's Greco-Roman 55 kg at 2021 European U23 Wrestling Championship.

Adem Uzun won one of the bronze medal in the greco-Roman style 55 kg at the 2021 World U23 Wrestling Championships held in Belgrade, the capital of Serbia. He reached the quarterfinals by defeating Arshad of India 7-1 in the last 16 round. He lost in the quarterfinals to Mavlud Rizmanov of Russia. He won by fall the bronze medal against Arslan Abdurakhmanov of Kazakhstan.

In 2022, he won the gold medal in his event at the Vehbi Emre & Hamit Kaplan Tournament held in Istanbul, Turkey.

References

External links
 

Living people
Turkish male sport wrestlers
2001 births
21st-century Turkish people
Islamic Solidarity Games competitors for Turkey